Lynne Lindsay-Payne is a former international lawn bowls competitor for Namibia.

In 1998 she won a silver medal at the 1998 Commonwealth Games in the pairs with Cathelean du Plessis. 

She was married to fellow Namibian bowls player Malcolm Lindsay-Payne.

References

1951 births
Living people
Namibian bowls players
Bowls players at the 1998 Commonwealth Games
Commonwealth Games medallists in lawn bowls
Commonwealth Games silver medallists for Namibia
Medallists at the 1998 Commonwealth Games